TT Electronics Plc is a global manufacturer of electronic components and provider of manufacturing services, headquartered in Woking, England. The company engineers and manufactures sensors, power modules, resistors, magnetics, semiconductors, connectors and optoelectronics for the industrial, aerospace and defence, medical and transportation markets.

TT Electronics sells to large manufacturers across the world and has three divisions – Sensors and Specialist Components, Power Electronics and Global Manufacturing Solutions.

In 2017, the company employed 4100 staff across 21 locations worldwide.

Listed on the London Stock Exchange (TTG.L), TT Electronics Plc reported a pre-tax profit of £31.5m (US$m) on sales of £476.2m (US$m) in 2021.

Product brands are AB Connectors, Aero Stanrew, BI Technologies, Cletronics, IRC, Optek Technology, Roxspur Measurement and Control, Semelab and Welwyn Components.

History 
Tyzack Turner Group plc, a company listed on the London Stock Market, was renamed TT Group plc in 1988.

In the 1990s the electronics activities were expanded with the acquisitions of the Magnetic Materials Group, AB Electronic Products Group and BI Technologies.
Further expansion was made with the purchase of Dale Electric International and the AEI Group, the Wire and Cables Division of General Electric Company plc.

In 2000, the company changed its name to TT Electronics plc.

In 1990, TT Group acquired Crystalate Manufacturing Company, a British resistors and sensors manufacturing company.

Operations 
TT Electronics has two main business units: "Sensors and Specialist Components" and "Power and Connectivity". The Sensors and Specialist Components business unit designs and manufactures sensors, resistors, and other electronic components for the aerospace, defense, medical, and industrial markets. The Power and Connectivity business unit designs and manufactures power supplies, connectors, and other electronic components for the automotive, energy, and industrial markets.

The company has over 21 manufacturing locations worldwide, including in the United Kingdom, United States, Mexico, China, and Malaysia. TT Electronics also provides engineering services, including design, prototyping, and testing, to its customers.

Corporate Responsibility 
TT Electronics is committed to corporate responsibility and sustainability. The company has set targets to reduce its carbon emissions and water usage, and it has implemented a number of initiatives to reduce waste and increase recycling. TT Electronics is also committed to ethical sourcing and has established a Supplier Code of Conduct.

In 2020, TT Electronics was recognized by the London Stock Exchange as one of the "1000 Companies to Inspire Britain", which recognizes fast-growing and dynamic businesses in the United Kingdom.

References

External links 
Directors & officers, Financial Times

Auto parts suppliers of the United Kingdom
Companies based in Surrey